Löberöd Castle is an estate and manor house at Eslöv Municipality in  Scania, Sweden.

History
The main building was built in 1798-1799 by Baron  Hans Ramel   (1724-1799). After Ramel's death his daughter, Countess Amalia Sparre  (1753-1830), sold the estate to her daughter Christina Sparre af Söfdeborg  and her husband Lieutenant General  and diplomat  Jacob De la Gardie  (1768-1842).

See also
List of castles in Sweden

References

 Buildings and structures in Skåne County